Kisan Mehta (31 August 1924 – 7 March 2015) was an Indian activist and President of Save Bombay Committee and Prakruti, nonprofits based in India.

Biography 

Kisan Mehta was born on 31 August 1924. He has a BA Hons in History & Economics, a LL.B from the Bombay University and Diplomas in Electrical Engineering and Prestressed Concrete. He was a Freedom Fighter participating in the Quit India Movement launched by Mahatma Gandhi in 1942. During this struggle he was arrested and imprisoned in the Yervada Central Prison, Pune for eight months in 1943.

Indian National Exhibition 
On release from the prison in 1943, he conceived and developed the Indian National Exhibition depicting the history of the Indian peoples' struggle for freedom beginning with the First War of Independence in 1857 and ending with the Quit India movement that culminated in Indians getting freedom on 15 August 1947. The exhibition of posters, illustrations, translates was first inaugurated by Jayaprakash Narayan on the eve of independence in May 1947. The Exhibition toured the country including would be Pakistan areas during the years 1947–50 to be inaugurated by Pandit Jawaharlal Nehru, Sardar Vallabhbhai Patel, Maulana Azad, Achyut Patwardan, Kamala Devi, etc., at various locations in India viewed by about 5 million visitors.

Himalaya Hamara exhibition 

He conceived and completed "Himalaya Hamara Exhibition" in 1963 at the time of the Sino-Indian War depicting the importance of the Himalaya to India and its people The exhibition, put up in the Cross Maidan near Churchgate and Flora Fountain, was spread on 50,000 sq metres of land and had a model of Himalaya measuring 150 metres by 80 metres and 10 metres high. It was viewed by 2 million visitors in 60 days. While presenting difficulties in defending the snow-clad Himalaya due to the terrain, the Exhibition showed the relevance and value of the Himalaya to India and called upon Indians to raise against the aggression and offer their supreme for the defence of Himalaya, which is an eternal source of spiritual, cultural, religious social values for people of Indian sub-continent.

Public service 
He was elected in 1968 to the Municipal Corporation of Greater Bombay as a Municipal Councillor and served in that role till 1977. He was also the Chairman of the Brihanmumbai Electric Supply and Transport (BEST), which provides public road transport bus services as well as supplying electric supply to Mumbai.

Electric Supply to Slums scheme 
He evolved "Electric Supply to Slums Scheme" for providing electric supply to slums and implemented the same throughout Bombay despite formidable government opposition and existence of a retrograde law . Inaugurated on 15 August 1971 in Dharavi, Bombay's most condemned slum colony, this unusual project has since been implemented in unauthorized slums by local authorities throughout the country bringing about a quantum transformation in the quality of life of the most unfortunate.

Environmental activism and social service 

Kisan Mehta resigned from active politics, Municipal Councillorship and all elected posts as well as retired from personal private business in 1977 and devotes time, resources and energies to issues of environment protection, natural resource conservation, equity to all to natural resources of the earth, civil rights, gender equality to provide hope and self-confidence to the shunned and the shunted. Kisan Mehta endeavours to live a simple life demanding the minimum on the Earth's natural resources. He has been one of the key proponents of Urban Agriculture in India.

Save Bombay Committee and Prakruti 
He set up Save Bombay Committee (SBC) in 1973 and Prakruti in 1988 as public trusts and registered societies. The SBC works in the area of urban and regional planning and development to ensure equal opportunity for improving the quality of life to all citizens by avoiding crowding, and removing inequalities as well as for open spaces, afforestation, environment protection etc. It has supported agitation against megaprojects like Sardar Sarovar Dam on the River Narmada, Tehri Dam project in Uttar Pradesh, Silent Valley Project in Kerala and many others throughout the country. Visited Japan, various countries in North America, South America and Europe, etc., over five times to persuade the foreign governments to not to support India's mega projects that affect the poor.

In his final decade of service through these NGOs, he worked mainly with Harshad Kamdar, Priya Salvi and Dilip Sankarreddy.

Largest organic cotton cultivation 
He campaigned for organic cultivation of cotton taken up in Vidarbha, Maharashtra's cotton growing region, with 135 farmers cultivating organically on 12 square kilometres of their land in 1995. It was recognised internationally as the largest organic cotton cultivation project in the world for that season. It became the torch bearer for organic cultivation movement in the country.

Strengthening environmental policies 
Convinced on the need to protect the environment for the survival and sustenance of living beings, Kisan Mehta has assiduously worked for bringing about change in the country's legal structure as well as for assuring accountability and transparency in delivery of service to citizens. The Maharashtra Urban Areas Preservation and Protection of Trees Act, 1975 came about due to his initiative. Following his working, the Central Government constituted for the first time the Ministry of Environment and Forests in 1978 and enacted the Environment Protection Act in 1981.

Opposition to Silent Valley Hydroelectric project 
His Public Interest Litigation against the Kerala Government proposal to establish hydroelectric project in the Silent Valley National Park, a rain forest in Kerala, resulted in the government dropping the project altogether.

Talks 
He has visited the United States, Europe, Russia, Asian and Latin American Countries, etc. for participating and presenting technical papers in UN and other conferences on urban issues, public health and waste management issues as well as on sustainable agriculture.

References

External links 
Save Bombay Committee and Prakruti

Indian environmentalists
Activists from Maharashtra
People from Mumbai
1924 births
2015 deaths